Callodistomidae is a family of trematodes belonging to the order Plagiorchiida.

Genera:
 Callodistomum Odhner, 1902
 Cholepotes Odhner, 1910
 Guptatrema Yamaguti, 1971
 Prosthenhystera Travassos, 1922
 Teratotrema Travassos, Artigas & Pereira, 1928

References

Plagiorchiida